Liu Zemin (July 1944 – 27 February 2017) was a Chinese politician. He was born in Lin County, Shanxi.

References

1944 births
2017 deaths
People's Republic of China politicians from Shanxi
Chinese Communist Party politicians from Shanxi
Politicians from Lüliang